Queen of the Night is the fourth studio album recorded by American singer Loleatta Holloway, released in 1978 on the Gold Mind label.

History
The album peaked at #47 on the R&B albums chart. It also reached #187 on the Billboard 200. The album features the single "Only You", a duet with Bunny Sigler, which peaked at #11 on the Hot Soul Singles chart and #87 on the Billboard Hot 100. "Catch Me On the Rebound" also charted at #92 on the Hot Soul Singles chart. The album was remastered and reissued with bonus tracks in 2014 by Big Break Records.

Track listing

Personnel
Earl Young, Scotty Miller, Steve Gadd – drums
Jimmy Williams, Raymond Earl, Gordon Edwards – bass
Norman Harris, T.J. Tindall, Edward Moore, Cornell Dupree, Eric Gale, Kim Miller – guitars
Bunny Sigler, Ron Kersey, Bruce Gray, Jimmy Sigler, Richard Tee, Dennis Richardson, George Bussey – keyboards
Larry Washington, James Walker, Emanuel Williams – congas
Bunny Harris, Moto – percussion
Carla Benson, Evette Benton, Barbara Ingram, Madeline Strickland, Mikki Farrow, Ron Tyson – background vocals

Charts

Singles

References

External links 
 

1978 albums
Loleatta Holloway albums
Albums produced by Norman Harris
Albums produced by Tom Moulton
Albums recorded at Sigma Sound Studios
Gold Mind Records albums